"À toi" ("To You") is a song by Joe Dassin from his 1976 album Le Jardin du Luxembourg.

Released in 1977 as a single, in France it was number one on the singles sales chart for two consecutive weeks from February 18 to March 3, 1977.

Track listing 
45 rpm 7" vinyl (France, 1977)

Charts

References 

1977 songs
1977 singles
Joe Dassin songs
French songs
CBS Records singles
Songs written by Pierre Delanoë
Number-one singles in France
Songs written by Claude Lemesle
Songs written by Joe Dassin
Song recordings produced by Jacques Plait